Chitrasen Chandam Singh (born 2 July 1986 in Manipur) is an Indian footballer. He played for Eagles F.C. on loan from IMG RELIANCE.

Honours

India U20
 South Asian Games Silver medal: 2004

External links
 
 Profile at Goal.com

Indian footballers
1986 births
Living people
Footballers from Manipur
Salgaocar FC players
Churchill Brothers FC Goa players
Shillong Lajong FC players
I-League players
India youth international footballers
Footballers at the 2006 Asian Games
Association football midfielders
Asian Games competitors for India
South Asian Games silver medalists for India
South Asian Games medalists in football